The Niabali, otherwise written Nyiyaparli, are an indigenous Australia tribe of the Pilbara region of Western Australia.

Language
Their language is called Nyiyaparli. It was customary to classify it  as one of the Ngayarda languages until Alan Dench reassigned it to the Wati languages in a 1991 study.

Country
They include the middle sector of the Fortescue River. To the northwest, they reach as far as Roy Hill on Weeli Wolli Creek, north of the Ophthalmia Range. Eastwards their boundaries run to Talawana.

Social organization
The Niabali have traditionally had strong tribal bonds with the Bailgu, and one result of the disaggregation and dispersion of the old territorial-tribal orders is that the two distinct groups began to intermarry, forming a more mixed set of communities.

History
Towards the end of the 19th. century - Norman Tindale speaks of the early 1890s - the Kartudjara's expansion forced the Niabali to withdraw from north of Savoiry Creek to the confine at the headwaters of Jigalong Creek.

Alternative names
 Njiabali.
 Njijabali.
 Nyiyaparli.
 Iabali.
 Janari. (inlanders/newcomers, an exonym used by tribes to their west)
 Jana.

Notes

Citations

Sources

Pilbara